Herbert von Kuhlberg (22 November 1893 – 12 September 1915) was a Latvian swimmer. He competed in the men's 100 metre freestyle event at the 1912 Summer Olympics for Russia. He was killed in action during World War I.

References

External links
 

1893 births
1915 deaths
Latvian male freestyle swimmers
Male freestyle swimmers from the Russian Empire
Olympic competitors for the Russian Empire
Swimmers at the 1912 Summer Olympics
Sportspeople from Riga
Russian military personnel killed in World War I